Sri Murugan is a 1946 Indian Tamil-language film produced by Jupiter Pictures and directed by M. Somasundaram and V. S. Narayanan. The film featured Honnappa Bhagavathar in the lead role. M. G. Ramachandran performed a dance number, Shiva Thandavam along with K. Malathi in the film.

Cast 
The list was compiled from The Hindu article.
Honnappa Bhagavathar
Trichur Premavathi
M. G. Ramachandran
K. Malathi
Dr. O. R. Balu
U. R. Jeevaratnam
(Yogam) Mangalam
Kali N. Rathnam
T. V. Kumudhini
Baby Harini

Crew 
The list was compiled from Film News Anandan's database.
Producers: M. Somasundaram and S. K. Mohideen
Director: M. Somasundaram and V. S. Narayanan
Story & Dialogues: A. S. A. Sami
Cinematography: Masthan, V. Krishnan and W. R. Subba Rao
Editing: D. R. Gopu
Art: Shantaram, P. P. Chowdri, M. P. Kuttiyappu
Choreography: K. R. Kumar
Studio: Central Studios
Production company: Jupiter Pictures

Production 

Initially M. K. Thyagaraja Bhagavathar was to play the lead role. After a few shots were taken with director Raja Chandrasekhar, Bhagavathar was arrested as a suspect in the Lakshmikanthan murder case. He was replaced with Bangalore-based Honnappa Bhagavathar. Raja Chandrasekhar walked out not willing to work with the newcomer. Producer M. Somasundaram directed the film along with V. S. Narayanan (who is the husband of Bhanumathi's sister).

MGR was cast in the role of Lord Shiva. He performed the Shiva Thandavam dance with Telugu actress K. Malathi. The dance was a highlight of the film and MGR worked hard and performed well. His performance impressed all and this laid the foundation for him to play as hero in Jupiter's next film Rajakumari.

Soundtrack 
Music was composed by S. M. Subbaiah Naidu and S. V. Venkatraman while the lyrics were penned by Papanasam Sivan.

U. R. Jeevarathinam, a female artiste, played the male role of Sage Narada and sang many songs. Honnappa Bhagavathar also had his share of songs.

References

External links 
Songs by U. R. Jeevarathinam
 03:30
 02:23
 02:32
 03:05
 03:15
 02:37

1940s Tamil-language films
1946 films
Films scored by S. V. Venkatraman
Indian black-and-white films
Films scored by S. M. Subbaiah Naidu
Jupiter Pictures films